Trace evidence is created when objects make contact, and material is transferred. This type of evidence is usually not visible to the eye and requires specific tools and techniques to be obtained. Due to this, trace evidence is often overlooked, and investigators must be trained to detect it. This type of evidence can link a victim to suspects and a victim or suspect to the crime scene. 

The importance of trace evidence in criminal investigations was shown by Dr. Edmond Locard in the early 20th century, with his exchange principle, that every contact leaves a trace. Since then, forensic scientists use trace evidence to reconstruct crimes and to describe the people, places, and things involved in them. Studies of homicides published in the forensic science literature show how trace evidence is used to solve crimes. 

There are three general categories in which forensic science uses trace evidence. It can be used for investigative aids, associative evidence, and in-scene reconstructions. In terms of investigative aids, trace evidence can provide information to determine the origin of a sample and determine the manufacture date of the material, all of which can limit potential suspects in a case. Associative evidence can associate with or link victims or suspects to a crime scene. For reconstructions, trace evidence can provide information to understand how a crime occurred or the events that occurred before the crime.

Examples
Vehicular accident reconstruction relies on some marks to estimate vehicle speed before and during an accident, as well as braking and impact forces.  Fabric prints of clothing worn by pedestrians in the paint and/or road grime of the striking vehicle can match a specific vehicle involved in a hit-and-run collision. Such traces are also known as "witness marks", especially in engineering and may be critical in understanding how a product failed. A typical witness mark could be an impact depression which broke a product, especially if that mark can be matched to the product which made the impact such as a hammer or nail. Such marks are also commonly encountered in criminal cases and include bite marks, puncture marks, bullet holes, etc.

Protection
The first preservation is to photograph in situ, and then remove the objects showing key traces, protect them, and analyze under controlled laboratory conditions.

Many techniques are used in the protection of trace evidence from criminal investigations, although all must be photographed as soon as possible, and while still in place. Samples may be collected by shaking, brushing, tapping, vacuuming, swabbing and handpicking. Great care may be needed to prevent contamination with other substances (such as natural oil and sweat on the hand of the collector). In some cases, such as with oil or grease, solvent extraction can be used to collect the evidence for analysis. The method used for collection is generally dependent on both the type of evidence and from where or what sort of object it is being collected.

Trace Evidence is also found in much smaller amounts at crime scenes.

Analysis

Analysis of trace materials most often begins with a visual examination of the evidence usually involving macrophotography. This is then usually followed by microscopic analysis, of which a number of different types are available depending on the type of material to be analyzed, such as a stereomicroscope, scanning electron microscope (SEM) or comparison microscope. SEM is especially useful because X-ray analysis can be conducted on selected areas of the sample, so is a form of microanalysis. It is useful where chemical residues can show unusual elements present which may indicate a chemical attack of the product. A car accident caused by a diesel fuel leak, for example, showed traces of sulfur on the cracked tube indicative of an attack by sulfuric acid from the battery.

Gunshot residue may be identified by elemental analysis using atomic absorption or with a scanning electron microscope equipped with an energy dispersive spectroscopy.  Small amounts of explosives, volatile hydrocarbons, and other chemicals are identified with the use of analytical instruments, such as gas chromatography, mass spectrometry, and infrared spectroscopy, all of which separate out the components of the chemicals.

Similar comments apply to damaged items from an accident scene, but care is needed in ensuring that the sample is not damaged by the testing or sampling for testing. Such nondestructive testing must always be used first before considering destructive methods which involve taking small samples from the item for more detailed tests, such as spectroscopic analysis. Use of all such methods must be done in consultation with other experts and the relevant authorities, such as lawyers on both sides of a case.

Problems
False positives and contamination by subsequent handling or nearby objects (e.g. mixing of blood from victim and attacker), for example, are problems owing to the presence of many common substances and the necessity of human involvement in the collection of trace evidence. Both can occur with DNA traces and fingerprints, and therefore evidence should be collected, analyzed, and presented in accordance with established guidelines. Partial fingerprints are even more vulnerable to false positives. Samples from accidents or crimes should therefore be protected as much as possible by enclosure in a sealable container as soon as possible, after an incident is under investigation.

See also
Evidence packaging
Forensic chemistry
Forensic engineering
Forensic materials engineering
Forensic polymer engineering
Forensic photography
Forensic profiling
Forensic science
Locard's exchange principle, which states that when two objects come into contact, there is an exchange of material
Skid mark
Digital traces
Blowback, material drawn into the barrel of a firearm post discharge

References

 Mute Witnesses: Trace evidence analysis, by  Houck, Max M (Ed), Academic Press (2001).
Forensic Materials Engineering: Case Studies by Peter Rhys Lewis, Colin Gagg, Ken Reynolds, CRC Press (2004).
The Analysis of Dust Traces, by Locard, Edmund, American Journal of Police Science, Vol. 1 (1930), Part I pp. 276–98, Part II pp. 401–18, Part III pp. 496–514.
Fiber Evidence and The Wayne Williams Trial, by Deadman, Harold A., FBI Law Enforcement Bulletin, March 1984, pp. 13–20, May 1984, pp. 10–19.
Trace Evidence-The Invisible Witness, by Petraco, Nicholas, Journal of Forensic Sciences, Volume 31, Jan. 1986, pp. 321–28.
Trajectory Reconstruction I: Trace Evidence in Flight, by Petraco, Nicholas, and DeForest, Peter, R., Journal of Forensic Sciences, Volume 35, Nov. 1990.

Forensic evidence